PinoyCentric is a web log (blog) that focuses on Filipino arts, culture and sciences.  As a digital-medium publication based in Chicago, Illinois, it caters photographs, news, featured events, stories and editorials regarding the status of  Filipino visual, film, literary and performance arts to Filipinos in the Philippines and those overseas through the use of the Internet.

History
PinoyCentric, a descendant of the 2000 website Ambibo, was founded by the award-winning Filipino photographer and journalist, Armand Bengua-Frasco, in September 2006.  Frasco, a native of Dipolog, Zamboanga del Norte, is also a correspondent for the Philippine Daily Inquirer newspaper.

References

Specific
Mayuga, Sylvia L. PinoyCentric: A Delight of Art and Memory, Global Nation/Sosy, Inquirer.net, March 23, 2007, retrieved on: July 22, 2007

General
PinoyCentric group on Flickr.com, 2007, retrieved on: July 22, 2007
Introducing PinoyCentric, BayanihanBlogs.com, April 10, 2007, retrieved on: July 22, 2007
Seasonings and Greetings: Armand Frasco, Diaspora - Diaspora, Philippine Daily Inquirer, Inquirer.net, December 15, 2006, retrieved on: July 22, 2007
Kikkerland Design Acquires Moleskinerie.com, Moleskinerie: Legends and Other Stories, Moleskinerie.com, January 12, 2007, retrieved on: July 22, 2007
Walker, Rob. The Way We Live Now: 6-26-05: Consumed; Look Smart, Magazine Desk, The New York Times, Late Edition - Final, Section 6, Page 26, Column 1, 752 words, and NYTimes.com, Sunday, June 26, 2005, retrieved on: July 22, 2007

External links
PinoyCentric, retrieved on: July 22, 2007

Internet properties established in 2006
Mass media in Chicago
Philippine blogs
Philippine social networking websites
Photography websites